The Densuș-Ciula Formation is a geological formation in Romania whose strata date back to the Late Cretaceous. It forms part of the Hațeg Island assemblage. Dinosaur remains are among the fossils that have been recovered from the formation. It is divided up into three members, the lower member is noted for high content of volcanogenic material and is poorly fossiliferous. While the Middle member consists of silty mudstones, sandstones and conglomerates containing volcanogenic clasts and is richly fossiliferous, while the upper member consists of matrix supported red conglomerates and is poorly fossiliferous.

Fossil content 
Indeterminate dromaeosaurid and possible indeterminate troodontid remains present in Judetul Hunedoara, Romania. An unnamed theropod is also present.

Amphibians

Squamates

Turtles

Crocodyliformes

Dinosaurs

Pterosaurs

Mammals

See also 
 List of dinosaur-bearing rock formations

References 

Geologic formations of Romania
Upper Cretaceous Series of Europe
Maastrichtian Stage